The Sociedade Brasileira de Zoologia, founded in 1978, is a scientific society devoted to Zoology. It publishes the journal Zoologia.

List of presidents 

 1978–1980: José Cândido de Melo Carvalho
 1980–1982: José Willibaldo Thomé
 1982–1988: Nelson Papavero
 1988–1990: Renato Contin Marinoni
 1990–1992: Adriano Lúcio Peracchi
 1992–1996: Jayme de Loyola e Silva
 1996–2004: Olaf H. H. Mielke
 2004–2008: Mário Antonio Navarro da Silva
 2008–2012: Rodney Ramiro Cavichioli
 2012–2016: Rosana Moreira da Rocha
 2016–2018: Luciane Marinoni

External links
 

Zoological societies